William Rydelere (fl. 1393), of Horsham, Sussex, was an English politician.

Family
His father was also an MP for Horsham, William Rydelere. He had one sister; the names of his mother and sister are unrecorded.

Career
He was a Member (MP) of the Parliament of England for Horsham in 1393.

References

Year of birth missing
Year of death missing
English MPs 1393
People from Horsham